Imoh Fred Friday (born 20 May 1995) is a Nigerian professional footballer who plays as a striker for Israeli Premier League club Beitar Jerusalem.

Career
Born in Port Harcourt, Nigeria, Friday played youth football for Unicem Rovers, Gabros FC and BUJOC Sports Academy in the lower leagues of Nigeria. He left Nigeria for Norway in 2013, and at the age of 17 he spent three weeks on trial at Lillestrøm before he was signed on a permanent basis. Then-coach Magnus Haglund handed him just three appearances all season as the club flirted with relegation.

In July 2016, Friday moved from Lillestrøm to Eredivisie side AZ Alkmaar, on a four-year contract. He moved on loan to Sparta Rotterdam in January 2018.

He was released by AZ in January 2020.

On 29 January 2021, after being a free agent for a year, Friday returned to Norwegian football, signing a two-year contract with Strømsgodset where he was assigned the number 9 jersey.

In February 2023 he signed for Beitar Jerusalem.

Career statistics

References

External links
 Profile at Voetbal International
 Profile at AZ Alkmaar

1995 births
Living people
Sportspeople from Port Harcourt
Association football forwards
Nigerian footballers
Lillestrøm SK players
AZ Alkmaar players
Jong AZ players
Sparta Rotterdam players
FC Twente players
Strømsgodset Toppfotball players
Beitar Jerusalem F.C. players
Eliteserien players
Eredivisie players
Eerste Divisie players
Israeli Premier League players
Nigerian expatriate footballers
Expatriate footballers in Norway
Expatriate footballers in the Netherlands
Expatriate footballers in Israel
Nigerian expatriate sportspeople in Norway
Nigerian expatriate sportspeople in the Netherlands
Nigerian expatriate sportspeople in Israel